The Lutetian is, in the geologic timescale, a stage or age in the Eocene. The Lutetian is preceded by the Ypresian and is followed by the Bartonian. Together with the Bartonian it is sometimes referred to as the Middle Eocene Subepoch.

Stratigraphic definition
The Lutetian was named after Lutetia, the Latin name for the city of Paris. The Lutetian Stage was introduced in scientific literature by French geologist Albert de Lapparent in 1883 and revised by A. Blondeau in 1981.

The base of the Lutetian Stage is at the first appearance of the nanofossil Blackites inflatus, according to an official reference profile (GSSP) established in 2011. Of two candidates located in Spain, the  Gorrondatxe section was chosen.

The top of the Lutetian (the base of the Bartonian) is at the first appearance of calcareous nanoplankton species Reticulofenestra reticulata.

The Lutetian overlaps with the Geiseltalian and lower Robiacian European Land Mammal Mega Zones (The Lutetian Stage spans the Mammal Paleogene zones 11 through 15.), the upper Bridgerian and Uintan North American Land Mammal Ages, the upper Arshantan and Irdinmanhan Asian Land Mammal Ages, and the Mustersan and lower Divisaderan South American Land Mammal Ages. It is also coeval with the middle Johannian regional stage of Australia and the upper Ulatisian and lower Nanzian regional stages of California.

References

External links

GeoWhen Database - Lutetian
Paleogene timescale, at the website of the subcommission for stratigraphic information of the ICS
Stratigraphic chart of the Paleogene, at the website of Norges Network of offshore records of geology and stratigraphy

 
Eocene geochronology
 
Geological ages